The testicular receptor 2 (TR2) also known as NR2C1 (nuclear receptor subfamily 2, group C, member 1) is protein that in humans is encoded by the NR2C1 gene. TR2 is a member of the nuclear receptor family of transcription factors.

Interactions 

Testicular receptor 2 has been shown to interact with:
 Androgen receptor,
  Estrogen receptor alpha,
 HDAC3, and
 HDAC4.

See also 
 Testicular receptor

References

Further reading 

 
 
 
 
 
 
 
 
 
 
 
 
 

Intracellular receptors
Transcription factors